Oshawa is a city in Ontario, Canada.

Oshawa may also refer to:
Oshawa, Cass County, Minnesota
Oshawa, Nicollet County, Minnesota
Oshawa Township, Nicollet County, Minnesota
Oshawa (electoral district)